In the mathematical field of complex analysis, the Bloch space, named after French mathematician André Bloch and denoted  or ℬ, is the space of holomorphic functions f defined on the open unit disc D in the complex plane, such that the function 

  

is bounded.  is a Banach space, with the norm defined by

 

This is referred to as the Bloch norm and the elements of the Bloch space are called Bloch functions.

Notes

Complex analysis